The 2016–17 3. Liga was the ninth season of the 3. Liga. Fixtures for the 2016–17 season were announced on 6 July 2016.

Teams
A total of 20 teams contested the league, including 14 sides from the 2015–16 3. Liga. Dynamo Dresden and Erzgebirge Aue were directly promoted to the 2016–17 2. Bundesliga at the end of the 2015–16 season. Erzgebirge made an immediate return to the 2. Bundesliga after being relegated in 2014–15. Dynamo returned to the second level after two seasons in the third tier. The two promoted teams were replaced by FSV Frankfurt and Paderborn, who finished in the bottom two places of the 2015–16 2. Bundesliga table.

At the other end of the table, Stuttgart Kickers, Energie Cottbus and Stuttgart II were relegated to the 2016–17 Regionalliga. The three relegated teams were replaced by the three winners of the 2015–16 Regionalliga promotion playoffs. Jahn Regensburg from the Regionalliga Bayern, immediately returned to national level. Zwickau from the Regionalliga Nordost returned to third level after 16 years and will make their debut in 3. Liga. Sportfreunde Lotte from the Regionalliga West is playing its debut season in the 3. Liga.

A further place in the league was available via a two-legged play-off between Würzburger Kickers, third of the 3. Liga and MSV Duisburg, 16th of 2. Bundesliga. The tie ended 4–1 on aggregate for Bavarian side and Würzburger Kickers were promoted to the second level after making successively promotions and 38 years in lower leagues. Thus, Duisburg immediately returned to third level.

Stadiums and locations

Personnel and kits

Managerial changes

League table

Results

Top goalscorers

Number of teams by state

References

External links

2016–17 in German football leagues
2016-17
Germ